Henry Gough may refer to:

 Sir Henry Gough (1649–1724), of Perry Hall, MP for Tamworth and Sheriff of Staffordshire
 Sir Henry Gough, 1st Baronet (1709–1774), his son, owner of the rotten borough of Bramber
 Henry Gough-Calthorpe, 1st Baron Calthorpe (1748–1798), his son, and his son Henry Gough-Calthorpe (1784–1790)

See also
 Harry Gough (disambiguation)
 Gough-Calthorpe family
 Henry Gough Witchell (1906–1965), English cricketer
 Sir Hugh Henry Gough VC (1833–1909), British Indian Army officer